Rose Hill, also known as Chance and Wheeler Point, is a historic home located at Earleville, Cecil County, Maryland, United States. It is the product of four major building periods: a gambrel-roofed frame structure built at the end of the 18th or beginning of the 19th century; a -story brick "town house" constructed on the east in 1837; and a small frame kitchen and a one-story wing built in the 1960s.  Also on the property are a smokehouse, ice house, and shed. The garden includes two of the largest yew trees living in the United States. It was the home of General Thomas Marsh Forman (1756–1845), who served as a young man in the American Revolutionary War.

Rose Hill was listed on the National Register of Historic Places in 1974.

References

External links

, including photo from 1997, Maryland Historical Trust

Houses on the National Register of Historic Places in Maryland
Houses in Cecil County, Maryland
Houses completed in 1837
National Register of Historic Places in Cecil County, Maryland